Bermuda: Cave of the Sharks (also known as  Cave of the Sharks and The Shark's Cave) is a 1978  Spanish-Italian-Mexican  adventure-mystery film written and directed  by Tonino Ricci and starring Andrés García and Janet Agren.

Plot
Off the Coast of Santo Domingo is recovered Andrés, an experienced diver, who disappeared six months before with the crew of the vessel on which he was traveling. Lovingly assisted by his wife Angelica and his brother Richard, the young man restores his health but can not remember any detail that sheds light on the mystery of the six months of incredible survival.

Cast
 Andrés García as Andres Montoya 
 Janet Agren as Angelica 
 Arthur Kennedy as Mr. Jackson 
 Pino Colizzi as Enrique 
 Máximo Valverde as Ricardo Montoya 
 Cinzia Monreale as Girl In The Boat
  Adriana Falco as Girl In The Boat 
  Nino Segurini as Doctor

References

External links

Italian adventure thriller films
Spanish adventure thriller films
Mexican adventure thriller films
1970s adventure thriller films
Films set in the Bermuda Triangle
Underwater action films
Films about shark attacks
Underwater civilizations in fiction
Films scored by Stelvio Cipriani
1970s Italian films
1970s Mexican films